North Walsham Town railway station was a station in North Walsham, Norfolk. It served the now closed Midland and Great Northern Joint Railway lines to Melton Constable via Aylsham, Melton Constable via Mundesley and Sheringham, and Great Yarmouth via Potter Heigham. It was closed in 1959 when the rest of the line was shut by British Railways, as it was considered unprofitable.

There was another station in the town, on the Great Eastern Railway network historically known as 'North Walsham Main' but now  simply known as North Walsham railway station.

References

External links 
 North Walsham Town station ( the north easterly one of the pair) on navigable 1946 O. S. map

Disused railway stations in Norfolk
Former Midland and Great Northern Joint Railway stations
Railway stations in Great Britain opened in 1881
Railway stations in Great Britain closed in 1959
1881 establishments in England
North Walsham